Zachery Mathew Nelson, (born August 5, 1975) is an American film producer and screenwriter.

Nelson won Best Sci-fi/Horror Screenplay at the 2009 London Independent Film Festival for his screenplay, The Void. It was also a Finalist at the 2009 Paranoia Film Festival in Los Angeles.

He resides in Chester Springs, Pennsylvania, a suburb of Philadelphia.

References

External links 
Imaginative Entertainment - Zach Nelson's production company
Review of The Void horror screenplay, Carson Reeves, AUGUST 6, 2009

American film producers
American male screenwriters
1975 births
Living people